Tiya Sircar (born May 16, 1982) is an American actress best known for her role as "Real Eleanor"/Vicky in The Good Place (2016–2020). She also provided the voice for Sabine Wren in Disney XD's Star Wars Rebels (2014–2018), played Rooni Schuman in ABC's Alex, Inc. (2018) and co-starred in The Internship (2013).

Early life and education
Sircar took dancing and acting classes at a young age. Her parents are Bengali Hindu college professors from Kolkata, West Bengal, India. 

Sircar attended the University of Texas at Austin. During her time in university, she interned at BLVD talent agency in Austin, which would go on to act as her first talent agency. The summer before her senior year, she was a tour guide in Rome. Sircar graduated with a BBA in Business/Marketing and a bachelor's in Theater & Dance. After graduation, she worked in sales at Dell before moving to Los Angeles to pursue her acting career.

Career
Sircar's television appearances include Master of None, House MD, Hannah Montana, Greek, Moonlight, Numbers, Privileged, Terminator: The Sarah Connor Chronicles, and she has played recurring characters on The Suite Life on Deck and The Good Place. In 2008, she played a Mac Genius as part of Apple's national ad campaign. The following year, she voiced an animated character for the Disney show Phineas & Ferb. She was cast in New Line Cinema's 17 Again as "Samantha"–a high school senior with a crush on the lead character played by Zac Efron.

Sircar also appeared in the 2013 theatrical release The Internship, comedy also starring Vince Vaughn, Owen Wilson, and Rose Byrne. Sircar has stated that she'd often get cast as ethnically ambiguous characters because she's not "Indian enough".

Sircar's voice acting for animation include the feature film Walking with Dinosaurs 3D and the television series Star Wars Rebels, which began airing on Disney XD in October 2014. Sircar provides the voice of Sabine Wren, a Mandalorian graffiti artist and explosives expert.

On March 24, 2014, it was announced that Sircar would star in the CBS/FOX pilot How I Met Your Dad, a spinoff of the successful How I Met Your Mother; however, CBS passed on the proposed project.

Sircar had a prominent role in the cast of the 2016 comedy television series The Good Place as "the real Eleanor Shellstrop," a virtuous woman mistakenly sent to hell in place of the series' protagonist, another Eleanor Shellstrop (Kristen Bell). 

In 2018, Sircar began a starring role opposite Zach Braff in ABC's Alex, Inc. The series was cancelled after one season. Sircar subsequently led the Netflix feature film Good Sam in 2019.

Filmography

Film

Television

Video games

Awards and nominations

References

External links
 

1982 births
American film actresses
Living people
Actresses from Texas
People from Fort Worth, Texas
American television actresses
21st-century American actresses
American people of Bengali descent
American actresses of Indian descent
McCombs School of Business alumni
American environmentalists
American women environmentalists
Activists from Texas
American voice actresses
American video game actresses
Moody College of Communication alumni